Rancourt is a surname. Notable people with the surname include:

Marc Rancourt (born 1984), Canadian ice hockey player
Nicole Rancourt, Canadian politician
Rene Rancourt (born 1939), American singer
Suzanne Rancourt (born 1959), Native American poet and veteran